Mogielnica  is a village in the administrative district of Gmina Boguchwała, within Rzeszów County, Subcarpathian Voivodeship, in south-eastern Poland. It does not have a mayor, or a leader, the village gets money off of farming, working from Rseszów, or Fungi Farming, located about two miles away from the village. The forest is a high point and is the peak of Mogielnica. There are no inhabitants in the forest, only part time lumberjacks come into the forest.

The nearest town to Mogielnica is Niechobrz, a small town, only a little bigger than Mogielnica.

Mogielnica is cut away from its neighbours by large, grassy hills which create problems due to their height.

There is a soccer stadium up in the hills which has its own hometown team, and is always gone because they always play competitively in other stadiums. They are teaching and hiring workers. They also have a Facebook.

There is a school that is teaching Pre-School, Elementary, and Middle.

There is also a church, which opens every Saturday through Sunday.

And there is also a fire station located about next to the church. 

The population is unknown, and is guessed to be about 50-80.

Buying property in Mogielnica is not expensive, and building a home is cheap, as it is a rural neighborhood, which does not come with a large population.

References

Mogielnica